The July Revolution (Spanish: Revolución Juliana) was a civic-military coup d'état that overthrew the government of President Gonzalo S. Córdova in Ecuador on July 9, 1925. It supplanted the Liberal order that had been established by the revolution of 1895.

1920s coups d'état and coup attempts
Political history of Ecuador
Revolutions in Ecuador